{{DISPLAYTITLE:C17H26O4}}
The molecular formula C17H26O4 (molar mass 294.38 g/mol, exact mass: 294.1831 u) may refer to:

 Embelin (2,5-dihydroxy-3-undecyl-1,4-benzoquinone)
 Gingerol

Molecular formulas